Crepidodera pluta is a species of flea beetles from Chrysomelidae family that can be found everywhere in Europe, except Andorra, Finland, Ireland, Monaco, Moldova, Norway, San Marino, and Vatican City.

References

Beetles described in 1804
Beetles of Europe
Alticini